Expectations is an album recorded by Keith Jarrett in 1972 and released on Columbia Records the same year. In addition to Jarrett, musicians on the recording include his "American quartet": Dewey Redman on tenor saxophone, Charlie Haden on bass, and Paul Motian on drums. Also featured are Sam Brown on electric guitar,  Airto on percussion, as well as brass and string sections whose members are not credited in the album information. Expectations was produced by George Avakian, Jarrett's manager since 1966. 

In January 1999 Jarrett wrote that "[Expectations] is a very special recording for me, and the only release that ties so many of the feelings I had about music together in such a rich, varied and coherent weave."

The album was awarded the Grand Prix du Disque in 1972.

Background: Jarrett and Columbia 
In late summer 1971, while Jarrett was still a member of the Miles Davis band, he was dropped by Atlantic Records due to a declining market for jazz, and also because Atlantic producer Nesuhi Ertegun disliked Jarrett's album Restoration Ruin. Avakian approached Columbia, with whom Davis had a contract, and proposed a double album. Jarrett was given a contract, and in April 1972 went into the studio to record Expectations. However, a few weeks after the album's release, Columbia suddenly dropped Jarrett in favor of Herbie Hancock. Jarrett was stunned, stating that he did not receive any communication from Columbia, and thus did not know he had been dropped. The label's actions later became known as "The Great Columbia Jazz Purge" (or "Bad Day at Black Rock"), during which Jarrett, Ornette Coleman, Bill Evans and Charles Mingus were all given contracts by Columbia only to be let go shortly afterwards (on the same day, according to some involved), as the company moved increasingly toward jazz fusion. (One writer commented that Columbia's decision was "rather like the 1961 New York Yankees suddenly placing Roger Maris, Yogi Berra, Whitey Ford, and Mickey Mantle on waivers.") Accordingly, Expectations remains Jarrett's only Columbia album under his own name.

The 1999 CD reissue (Columbia Legacy) original notes contain "A little essay on Expectactions" by Keith Jarrett. There he explains that:

Jarrett notes on Columbia CD reissue
Better than anyone else regarding his own critique, in 1999, on occasion of the Columbia Legacy CD reissue, Jarrett unfolds a few details about the production of Expectations:

Reception

In a review for AllMusic, Richard S. Ginell wrote: "This was the first real indication to the world that Keith Jarrett was an ambitious, multi-talented threat to be reckoned with, an explosion of polystylistic music that sprawled over two LPs (now squeezed onto a single CD)... Jarrett again turns his early rampant eclecticism loose -- from earthy gospel-tinged soul-jazz to the freewheeling atonal avant-garde -- yet this time he does it with an exuberance and expansiveness that puts his previous solo work in the shade." The authors of the Penguin Guide to Jazz Recordings commented: "there are few better places to sample Jarrett's uncanny ability to make disparate musical ideas work together... the logic of the session is impeccable."

Pianist Ethan Iverson praised the track titled "Roussillon", writing "Jarrett plays the head on soprano, but then takes a burning solo on piano. Redman enters with his trademark screaming through the horn while playing. This is great music." Regarding "Bring Back the Time When (If)," he wrote: "A good theme, a space between a normal piano tune and the Ornette thing. The scalding tenor solo is Redman at his most Albert Ayler-esque. Nice misterioso ending with unexpected soft final piano chord. The band is coming together." Iverson also singled out "There is a Road (God's River)", commenting: "The pianist begins with a rich rumination that evolves into a full gospel cry; nobody else can play like this. The contrasting theme, full orchestra chords behind Brown's rock guitar, is distinctive and powerful... It might be Jarrett’s most impressive piece for piano plus orchestra."

Jarrett biographer Ian Carr wrote that, on Expectations, there is "a deepening maturity in Jarrett's whole conception. In short, when he is not trying to sound like Ornette Coleman he is beginning to sound very much like himself. Also the emotional areas he projects are broadening and deepening. His fecund imagination produces endlessly interesting melodies and powerful rhythms. And his playing reaches new heights of expression... This is a glimpse of the scope of Jarrett's vision and its all-embracing concept of music." Carr called the concluding track a "truly amazing performance", and commented: "here at last it seems that Keith Jarrett has achieved a new unity between the diverse strands of his music. This piece has the power of a religious anthem."

Track listing
All compositions by Keith Jarrett
"Vision" – 0:51
"Common Mama" – 8:14
"The Magician in You" – 6:55
"Roussillion" – 5:25
"Expectations" – 4:29
"Take Me Back" – 9:33
"The Circular Letter (for J.K.)" – 5:04
"Nomads" – 17:23
"Sundance" – 4:31
"Bring Back the Time When (If)" – 9:53
"There Is a Road (God's River)" – 5:32

Personnel
Keith Jarrett - piano, organ, soprano saxophone, tambourine, percussion, arrangements
Dewey Redman - tenor saxophone, percussion 
Charlie Haden - bass
Paul Motian - drums
Sam Brown - guitar 
Airto Moreira - percussion
Unidentified string section 
Unidentified brass

(Moreira and Motian both play drums on "The Circular Letter" and "Sundance")

References 

1972 albums
Columbia Records albums
Keith Jarrett albums
Albums produced by George Avakian
Albums arranged by Keith Jarrett